Charles Edward Maurice Spencer, 9th Earl Spencer,  (born 20 May 1964), styled Viscount Althorp between 1975 and 1992, is a British peer, author, journalist, and broadcaster. He is the younger brother of Diana, Princess of Wales, and is the maternal uncle of William, Prince of Wales, and Prince Harry, Duke of Sussex.

Early life and education
Charles Edward Maurice Spencer was born in London on 20 May 1964. Queen Elizabeth II was his godmother. His parents were titled Viscount and Viscountess Althorp, as his paternal grandfather, Albert Spencer, 7th Earl Spencer, was still alive at the time of his birth. Spencer grew up with three older sisters, Sarah, Jane, and Diana. His infant brother John was born four years before him, but died hours after his birth. Charles and Diana were very close to each other in their childhood. His parents' troubled marriage ended in divorce when he was three years old. Spencer became styled as Viscount Althorp when his father became Earl Spencer in 1975. He was educated at Eton College and read Modern History at Magdalen College, Oxford.

Career
Spencer worked as an on-air correspondent with NBC News from 1986 to 1995, primarily for the network's morning programme, Today, and NBC Nightly News. He wrote and presented the 12-part documentary series Great Houses of the World (1994–1995) for NBC Super Channel. He also worked as a reporter for Granada Television from 1991 to 1993.

Spencer has written several book reviews for The Guardian and The Independent on Sunday as well as feature stories for The Guardian, The Daily Telegraph, The Sunday Telegraph and American publications such as Vanity Fair, Verandah and Nest.

Upon his father's death on 29 March 1992, 27-year-old Spencer succeeded as 9th Earl Spencer, 9th Viscount Althorp, 9th Viscount Spencer of Althorp, 9th Baron Spencer of Althorp, and 4th Viscount Althorp. He also inherited Althorp, the family's ancestral seat in Northamptonshire. Since 2009, he has restored Althorp, re-roofing it and restoring its entire exterior for the first time since the 1780s. He has also helped establish Althorp Living History, a handmade fine-furniture line reproducing pieces from the collection at Althorp. The Spencer family's wealth derived from their profitable sheep farming in the Tudor era.

On 31 August 1997, his elder sister Diana died after a car crash in Paris and Spencer delivered the eulogy at her funeral service held at Westminster Abbey six days later. In his eulogy he rebuked both Britain's royal family and the press for their treatment of his sister. Spencer ruled out conspiracy theories concerning his sister's death, and called the alleged letter she wrote 10 months before her death in which she discussed her fears of a planned accident "just a bizarre coincidence rather than tied in with reality." Spencer received an apology from Tim Davie, the BBC's director general, in late 2020 for the unethical practices used by BBC staff to gain his sister's consent to be interviewed in November 1995 for the corporation's Panorama television programme. The Earl said a full inquiry should be conducted which Davie has said will happen.

The Earl was a member of the House of Lords from 29 March 1992 (the day his father died and he inherited the peerage) until the House of Lords Act 1999 excluded most hereditary peers on 11 November 1999.

On several occasions, Spencer has been accused of refusing to allow his sister Diana to live in a cottage on the Althorp estate, despite her request at the height of her emotional difficulties. These allegations have repeatedly been proven to be untrue, as seen in an apology published by The Times in 2021, admitting that "having considered his sister's safety, and in line with police advice, the Earl offered the Princess of Wales a number of properties included Wormleighton Manor, the Spencer family's original ancestral home".

Diana was buried on Spencer's ancestral estate, Althorp, where he built a garden temple memorial and a museum to her memory, displaying her wedding dress and other personal effects. The museum was opened to the public in 1998 with all profits going to Diana's Memorial Fund, also set up by Spencer. At this stage, Spencer began writing a series of books dealing with the estate itself and with his family history, beginning with an account of his ancestral home, Althorp: the Story of an English House, published in 1998.

In 2003, Spencer founded the Althorp Literary Festival. Speakers at the annual event have included the authors Bill Bryson, Helen Fielding, Antonia Fraser, and Boris Johnson. In 2004, he presented two documentaries for the History Channel on Blenheim: Battle for Europe.

Spencer was appointed a Deputy Lieutenant of Northamptonshire in November 2005; the Spencer family have had a long association with the county, the home of the family seat. Spencer is also a patron of the Northamptonshire County Cricket Club. In 2023, he began presenting the podcast The Rabbit Hole Detectives with Richard Coles and Cat Jarman, in which each of them is given an obscure topic and then they discuss their findings.

Personal life
The Earl Spencer has seven children from three marriages.

On 16 September 1989, Spencer, then known by the courtesy title of Viscount Althorp, married Victoria Lockwood (born 20 November 1965). Spencer and Lockwood were divorced on 3 December 1997, with Diana’s death occurring while the case was in progress. After the divorce, Spencer returned to the United Kingdom from Cape Town, South Africa, where Spencer and Lockwood had relocated their family in 1995 to avoid media attention. The Earl has four children by Victoria Lockwood, three daughters and one son:

 Lady Kitty Eleanor Spencer (born 28 December 1990); married Michael Lewis in 2021.
 Lady Eliza Victoria Spencer (born 10 July 1992)
 Lady Katya Amelia Spencer (born 10 July 1992); engaged to Greg Mallett, nephew of former South African national rugby coach Nick Mallett.
 Louis Spencer, Viscount Althorp (born 14 March 1994); heir apparent to the earldom.

On 15 December 2001, he married Caroline Freud (née Hutton; born 16 October 1966), former wife of businessman Matthew Freud. They separated in 2007 and later divorced. They have two children:
 The Honourable Edmund Spencer (born 6 October 2003)
 Lady Lara Spencer (born 16 March 2006)

On 18 June 2011 at Althorp, Spencer married Karen Gordon (née Villeneuve; born 30 November 1972), a Canadian philanthropist, the founder and chief executive of Whole Child International, a charity based in Los Angeles that works to improve the lot of orphaned, abandoned, or abused children. They have one child together:
 Lady Charlotte Diana Spencer (born 30 July 2012) named in honour of her aunt, Diana, Princess of Wales.

The Earl resides at Althorp House, Northamptonshire. He inherited the estate at the age of 27, according to the letters patent, because he was the eldest male in the Spencer family.

Books
 Althorp: the Story of an English House (1998). London: Viking.
 The Spencer Family (1999). London: Viking. US edition: The Spencers: a Personal History of an English Family (2000).
 Blenheim: Battle for Europe (2004). London: Weidenfeld & Nicolson; paperback edition by Phoenix, 2005. . This book was a Sunday Times best-seller, and was shortlisted for "History Book of the Year" at the 2005 National Book Awards.
 Prince Rupert: The Last Cavalier (2007). London: Weidenfeld & Nicolson .
 Killers of the King: The Men Who Dared to Execute Charles I (2014). London: Bloomsbury . This book was a Sunday Times best-seller.
 To Catch A King: Charles II's Great Escape (2017). London: William Collins 
 The White Ship: Conquest, Anarchy and the Wrecking of Henry I's Dream (2020). London: William Collins

Coat of arms

References

Sources
 Diana: Her True Story, written by Andrew Morton
 Two works by Lady Colin Campbell: Diana in Private and Royal Marriages
 The obituaries for the 8th Earl Spencer, Diana, Princess of Wales, and Frances Shand Kydd in The Times.

External links
 Spencer of Althorp: Charles Spencer
 
 
 

1964 births
Living people
Charles Spencer, 9th Earl Spencer
 09
Deputy Lieutenants of Northamptonshire
Pages of Honour
People educated at Eton College
Alumni of Magdalen College, Oxford
British expatriates in South Africa
British historians
21st-century British landowners
Spencer